The discography of Senses Fail, an American rock band, consists of seven studio albums, one compilation album, one live album, three extended plays and 11 singles.

Albums

Studio albums

Compilation albums

Live albums

Extended plays

Singles

Other appearances

Music videos

References

External links
 

Discographies of American artists
Post-hardcore group discographies